It's Flashbeagle, Charlie Brown is the 27th prime-time animated musical television special based upon the comic strip Peanuts by Charles M. Schulz. It originally aired on CBS on April 16, 1984.

The special is presented as an original musical which features parodies of the early-1980s breakdancing craze, MTV, the films Saturday Night Fever, Flashdance, and Footloose, and a number of popular top 40 hit songs of the early 1980s. The program takes the form of a musical, presenting a series of different vignettes instead of a strong unifying plot.

Plot
After Snoopy defeats Peppermint Patty at football, he celebrates with a dance party ("Flashbeagle").

At school, Peppermint Patty leads her gym class in a workout ("Peppermint Patty's PE Program (I'm in Shape)")

Charlie Brown and Sally host a party, where everyone begins a game of "Simon Says" until Lucy takes charge ("Lucy Says"). Afterwards, the kids dance to a song about Pigpen ("Pigpen Hoedown").

The next morning, Snoopy is sleeping when Charlie Brown berates him for oversleeping while others work.

Later that day, Snoopy decides on an outfit for a night on the town and heads to a discothèque with Franklin, where his dance moves are met with acclaim from the other club-goers ("Flashbeagle (1st Reprise)"). When he heads home exhausted from his performance, Charlie Brown takes notice and can't believe what his dog has done and become.

The next morning, Sally takes a groggy Snoopy to school for Show and Tell. After 5 talks about his pet chameleon, Sally's turn comes, but Snoopy is still exhausted. However, 5 berates Snoopy for just sitting there asleep. He changes all of that by turning on his boom box, causing Snoopy to awaken and dance, and the children gradually join in ("Flashbeagle (2nd Reprise)").

Charlie Brown tells Sally that he should do something about his dog's behavior. Sally disagrees because, thanks to Snoopy, she got an "A" (for the first time) for Show and Tell.

Voice cast
 Brett Johnson as Charlie Brown
 Brad Kesten as Charlie Brown's singing voice
 Stacy Ferguson as Sally Brown
 Jeremy Schoenberg as Linus van Pelt
 David T. Wagner as Linus' singing voice
 Heather Stoneman as Lucy van Pelt
 Jessie Lee Smith as Lucy's singing voice
 Gary Goren as Schroeder/Tommy, the kid
 Gini Holtzman as Peppermint Patty
 Keri Houlihan as Marcie
 Bill Melendez as Snoopy/Woodstock

Production
After seeing Flashdance, Schulz decided to draw a parody-tribute to what he saw with Snoopy performing as the "flashdancer", sporting the same dance clothes worn by the main character Alex (Jennifer Beals); in a November 29, 1983, comic strip that later led to the idea of turning it into an animated TV special.

Bill Melendez explained that the dancing Snoopy in the club scene was done by a process called rotoscoping where the character is drawn over live-action pictures. Marine Jahan, the stunt dancer from Flashdance, was chosen to do scenes where Snoopy was dancing in the special. The animators rotoscoped live-action pictures of Jahan to Snoopy in order to make these scenes.

Schulz's 12-year-old daughter Jill was said to have inspired the "She's in Shape" sequence when Schulz drew images.

The cast of this special (except Gary Goren) would work on the second season of The Charlie Brown and Snoopy Show.

Soundtrack
A soundtrack was issued on Disneyland Records under the "Charlie Brown Records" banner (like the earlier "Read-Along" records Disney issued for Peanuts) featuring songs from this special.  Half of the other songs later appeared on the 1985 documentary It's Your 20th Television Anniversary, Charlie Brown. Songs were written by Ed Bogas and Desirée Goyette; Goyette sings on the album, alongside Joey Scarbury of "Believe It or Not" fame. The album was produced by Bogas, Goyette, Lee Mendelson and Jymn Magon. Bill Meyers, best known for his work on Earth, Wind & Fire's hit "Let's Groove", did the horn arrangements on some of the songs.

Side One:
"Flashbeagle" *
"Pigpen Hoedown" *
"Don't Give Up, Charlie Brown" **
"Peppermint Patty's PE Program (I'm in Shape)" *
"Snoopy" *

Side Two:
"Someday, Charlie Brown" **
"Let's Have a Party" ^
"Lucy Says" *
"Woodstock" **
"Snoopy's Big Debut" ** (sung by Robert Towers as Snoopy)

 * - From It's Flashbeagle, Charlie Brown
 ** - From It's Your 20th Television Anniversary, Charlie Brown
 ^ - Theme from The Charlie Brown and Snoopy Show; this version was later used for the second season in 1985

Home media
The special was released on VHS in 1988 by Hi-Tops Video, Again On March 9, 1994, on The Snoopy Double Feature V. 2 along with "He's Your Dog, Charlie Brown" from Paramount Home Video, And on DVD by Warner Home Video as a bonus feature to Snoopy's Reunion on April 7, 2009. In 2017, it was released on 4K Blu-ray as a part of the Peanuts Holiday Collection.

References

 Celebrating Peanuts: 60 Years

External links
 

1984 animated films
1984 television specials
1980s American television specials
1980s animated television specials
Breakdancing films
CBS television specials
Musical television specials
Peanuts television specials
Television shows directed by Bill Melendez
Television shows directed by Sam Jaimes
Television shows written by Charles M. Schulz